Charltona cramboides is a moth in the family Crambidae. It was described by Francis Walker in 1865. It is found in India.

References

Crambinae
Moths described in 1865
Taxa named by Francis Walker (entomologist)